Manthos Kaloudis (1911–1990) was a Greek cyclist. He competed in three events at the 1948 Summer Olympics.

References

External links
 

1911 births
1990 deaths
Greek male cyclists
Olympic cyclists of Greece
Cyclists at the 1948 Summer Olympics
Place of birth missing
20th-century Greek people